D.080 is a  long state highway running from Horasan, Erzurum Province to the border with Azerbaijan near Dilucu. The route connects to Azerbaijan, via the Nakhchivan Autonomous Republic, and is the only crossing between the two countries. The route is mostly a non-divided, four-lane highway. 

080
Transport in Erzurum Province
Transport in Kars Province
Transport in Iğdır  Province